Mauritsstad (or Mauritius) was the capital of Dutch Brazil, and is now a part of the Brazilian city of Recife.
The city was built on the island of Antonio Vaz opposite Recife, and designed by architect Pieter Post. It was named after Governor Johan Maurits van Nassau-Siegen, who had founded the city and the adjoining palace Vrijburgh. Mauritsstad was the cultural center of the New World, with the first botanical garden and the first zoo in America, and a museum with three hundred stuffed monkeys. The city's Jewish population constructed the first synagogue in the Americas. The city was eventually recaptured by the Portuguese in 1654. 

Dutch Brazil
Historic Jewish communities
History of Recife
Geography of Pernambuco
Former colonial capitals
Jews and Judaism in Recife
Populated places established by the Dutch West India Company